Bernard Bloch (born 11 December 1949) is a French actor and theatre director.

Filmography 
 1972 : Albert Einstein (TV) : Un membre de l'académie d'Olympia
 1974 : The Story of Paul : L'harmonica
 1980 : Fernand : Fernand
 1980 : Le Cheval dans le béton (TV) : Maury
 1981 : Allons z'enfants : Adjudant Viellard
 1982 : Les Prédateurs (TV) : Anatole
 1982 : Enigma
 1984 : La Digue (TV) : Le technicien
 1985 : Châteauvallon (série TV)
 1986 :  : Kovacs
 1986 : Fatherland : Journalist
 1987 : La fée carabine (TV) : Cercaire
 1989 : Radio Corbeau : Louis Gerfaut
 1989 : Un français libre (The Free Frenchman) : Col. Vivet
 1989 :  : Jung
 1990 : Secret défense (Hidden Agenda) : Henri
 1991 : Les Carnassiers (TV) : Commissaire Lagorce
 1991 : Arthur Rimbaud - Une biographie : Ernest Delahaye
 1991 : Salut les coquins (TV) : Lormont
 1993 : Paranoïa
 1993 : L'Affaire Seznec (TV) : Le Her
 1993 : La Naissance de l'amour : Le douanier
 1995 : Kabloonak : Thierry Malet
 1996 : Morlock: Le tunnel (TV) : Colbert
 1996 : Un monde meilleur (TV) : Steven
 1996 : Le Coeur fantôme : Guard
 1996 : Un héros très discret : Ernst
 1996 : Des nouvelles du bon Dieu
 1997 : Alors voilà : Marcel
 1998 : Ronin : Sergei
 1999 : À mort la mort : Bernard
 1999 : Une pour toutes : Le chef de service
 2000 : La Vache et le président : Bichon
 2002 : Novo : Docteur Sagem
 2003 : Monsieur N. : Von Holgendorp
 2003 : Le Coût de la vie : Richet, l'huissier
 2003 : Inquiétudes : Le père de Bruno
 2004 : À l'arraché : L'homme "qui a tout vu"
 2004 : Je suis un assassin : Le portier
 2004 : Double zéro : Col. Fosse
 2005 : Entre ses mains : Le directeur de la compagnie d'assurances
 2005 : S.A.C.: Des hommes dans l'ombre (TV) : Pierre-Marie Rosa
 2006 : Du jour au lendemain : Magne
 2006 : Joséphine, ange gardien TV Series (1 Episode : "Remue-ménage") : Malot
 2012 : Queen of Montreuil

External links 
 

Living people
1949 births
French male film actors
French male television actors
Actors from Mulhouse
20th-century French male actors
21st-century French male actors
French male stage actors
French theatre directors